Phyllis's Engine is a  granite pinnacle located in British Columbia, Canada.

Description
Phyllis's Engine is set within Garibaldi Provincial Park and is part of the Garibaldi Ranges of the Coast Mountains. Precipitation runoff and glacial meltwater from the west side of the peak drains to Garibaldi Lake, and the eastern slope drains to Cheakamus Lake.

History

The peak is named after Phyllis Dyke (Mrs. Edward Beltz), a pioneering British Columbia Mountaineering Club member who thought the arrangement of pinnacles and spires resembled a 19th-century steam locomotive, so her fellow climbers jokingly referred to the landform as "Phyllis's Engine", circa 1914. The name was formally submitted by Karl Ricker in 1978 as recommended by Neal Carter of the BC Mountaineering Club, and contrary to popular belief, the name does not refer to Phyllis Munday. The toponym was adopted as "Phyllis' Engine" on March 9, 1979, and officially changed to "Phyllis's Engine" on January 6, 1995, by the Geographical Names Board of Canada.

The first ascent of Phyllis's Engine was made in 1966 by F. Gratwhol and T. Kempter.

Climate

Based on the Köppen climate classification, Phyllis's Engine is located in the marine west coast climate zone of western North America. Most weather fronts originate in the Pacific Ocean, and travel east toward the Coast Mountains where they are forced upward by the range (Orographic lift), causing them to drop their moisture in the form of rain or snowfall. As a result, the Coast Mountains experience high precipitation, especially during the winter months in the form of snowfall. Winter temperatures can drop below −20 °C with wind chill factors below −30 °C. This climate supports the Sphinx Glacier on the west slope and the Cheakamus Glacier on the east slope.

See also
 
 Geography of British Columbia

Gallery

References

External links
 Phyllis's Engine: Weather forecast
 Phyllis's Engine Rock Climbing: Mountainproject.com

Garibaldi Ranges
Two-thousanders of British Columbia
Sea-to-Sky Corridor
New Westminster Land District
Coast Mountains